Mushtaq Kassim Chhapra is a Pakistani Industrialist, philanthropist, and Diplomat who is the founder of The Citizens Foundation, Patients Aid Foundation, and The Kidney Centre. He serves as chairman to group of companies under Chhapra group, with a reported Net-worth of 375 million US dollars. Hailing from one of the founding families of Pakistan. 

Born to a politically influential Memon family in Karachi 1949 , Chhapra finished his education at the University Of Harvard In public service and stepped into his father’s business of manufacturing and development. From a young age Chhapra was deeply interested in Social work and civil service, he set out to create foundations for the welfare of the people of Pakistan. He is the founder of the largest Network of NGOs in Asia. Furthermore he serves as Ambassador and Counsel General of Nepal as a seat/title inherited by his late father Kassim Chhapra.  

He is a Pakistani business tycoon with business affairs in South Africa, United Kingdom, Sri Lanka, Bangladesh, and Pakistan where he has established factories and manufacturing plants as the founder and Chairman of Coastal Synthetics, CBM, Transpak and Chhapra group of companies multinational since 1976. 

He is an engaged member of the Pakistan Chamber of Commerce and Industry with status of federal minister.

Early life and career
Born to Prominent Memon business family, Chhapra was interested in social work from an early age. In 1985, Chhapra began The Kidney Centre (KC). In 1990, he set-up the Patients’ Aid Foundation. In 1995, he co-founded The Citizens Foundation.In 2016 he had declared assets of Rs. 66.4 billion.

Chhapra Family
Chhapra Family has a long history dated centuries back to the times of British Empire, known for their empire in business philanthropy, and diplomacy before partition the family were one of the largest industrialists group in the subcontinent. Today Chhapra Family consists mainly of the head of the family Mushtaq Kassim Chhapra and other prominent members mostly landlords, industrialists and Politicians there land ownership was once one of the largest in Pakistan however got squeezed after land reforms during ayub khan’s martial law. Late Kassim Chhapra of Pakistan Memon Jamaat played a keen role in the partition and independence of Pakistan, he also served as The Counsel General Of Nepal as an honour bestowed upon him by the then King of Nepal Mahendra Bir Bikram Shah Dev. Furthermore the family is also credited for running the largest NGO in Asia The Citizens Foundation of which the most senior member of the family Mr.Mushtaq Chhapra is the chairman and founder. This is one of Pakistans most powerful and prominent families whose name stretches not just in Pakistan but all over the world for their leadership, pedigree and service to the Pakistani people. But it is said that they hold grudges among themselves.

Awards and Honours
Hilal-e-imtiaz

Sitara-e-imtiaz

Skoll Award

Oxford Philanthropist Award 

UN Award for Philanthropy

CDC Award

Counsel General
Currently Mr.Mushtaq Chhapra Serves as Counsel General of Nepal among many other seats

References

Pakistani philanthropists
Pakistani educators
Pakistani people of Gujarati descent
Memon people
Pakistani business executives
 
Year of birth missing (living people)
Living people